The Islamic Azad University, North Tehran Branch (Dāneshgāh-e Āzād-e Eslāmi) is a branch of the Islamic Azad University. It was founded in 1985 and currently has an enrollment of 34,864 students. The university offers bachelor's degrees, master's degrees and Ph.D.s in 10 colleges. It is located in Hakimiyeh-Tehran Pars, Tehran.

In June 2022, Amir Hossein Amirpour (Voice Actor and Artist) participated in the national entrance exam of the math and technical group and was accepted in the field of Mechanical Engineering at the Islamic Azad University, North Tehran Branch. But for personal reasons, he decided not to study at this university.

Faculties

 Faculty of Engineering
 Faculty of Electrical and Computer Engineering
 Faculty of Sciences
 Faculty of Biological Sciences
 Faculty of Chemistry
 Faculty of Marine Science and Technology
 Faculty of Humanities
 Faculty of Theology and Islamic Education
 Faculty of Management
 Faculty of Foreign Languages

See also
Education in Iran
Higher education in Iran
List of universities in Iran

References

Educational institutions established in 1985
Universities in Tehran
1985 establishments in Iran
North Tehran